Max von Guilleaume (16 February 1866 – 15 June 1932) was a German businessman and sportsman. He competed in the equestrian mail coach event at the 1900 Summer Olympics.

References

External links
 

1866 births
1932 deaths
German male equestrians
Olympic equestrians of Germany
Equestrians at the 1900 Summer Olympics
Sportspeople from Cologne
Suicides in Germany